Partizansky District may refer to:
Partizansky District, Russia, name of several districts in Russia
Partyzanski District, a city district of Minsk, Belarus